Diatraea crambidoides, the southern cornstalk borer moth, is a species of moth of the family Crambidae described by Augustus Radcliffe Grote in 1880. It is found in North America, from Alabama and northern Florida to Ohio and Maryland. Its wingspan is 15–40 mm, and adults are straw colored to dull white. The forewings are slightly darker than the hindwings. There are two generations per year.

The larvae feed on Zea mays, Tripsacum dactyloides and Sorghum species. Young larvae feed within the plant whorl. They also tunnel in the midribs of leaves, and sometimes destroy growing points within leaf whorls. As larvae grow larger they tunnel into the stalks. Full-grown larvae are about 25 mm long. The winter form is creamy yellow with a dark brown head. The summer form is milky white and covered with black spots. The species overwinters in the larval stage within cavities in corn taproots. Summer pupation occurs in the portion of the stalk which is above the ground. Pupation of the hibernating generation occurs in the base of the stalk or in large roots.

References

Moths described in 1880
Chiloini